Marshall is the name of some places in the U.S. state of Wisconsin:

Marshall, Dane County, Wisconsin, a village
Marshall, Richland County, Wisconsin, a town
Marshall, Rusk County, Wisconsin, a town

See also 
Marshall (disambiguation)